- Hyzon Motors Inc. is an American automotive company based in Rochester, New York. Hyzon develops and manufactures zero-emissions hydrogen fuel cell commercial vehicles, including heavy duty trucks, buses and coaches. It has offices in Chicago, Detroit, Groningen (the Netherlands), Melbourne (Australia), Singapore, and Shanghai. With 87 fuel cell electric vehicles delivered in 2021, Hyzon leads OEMs in fuel cell heavy truck deployments.

Hyzon Motors Middle East
The Kingdom of Saudi Arabia plans to make NEOM a city with sustainable energy and zero carbon emissions. NEOM, Hyzon and Modern Group have signed a Memorandum of Understanding to establish a company called Hyzon Motors Middle East for the development of an assembly facility in NEOM with an annual capacity of 10,000 vehicles targeting the markets of Saudi Arabia and the Gulf Cooperation Council (GCC) in the Middle East.

See also
Hydrogen vehicle
Fuel cell
Hydrogen fuel

References

External links 
 

Fuel cell manufacturers
Fuel cell vehicles
Hydrogen vehicles